A Schultüte ("school cone"), also known as a Zuckertüte ("sugar cone") in some parts of Germany, is a large cone-shaped, cornucopia-styled container made of paper, cardboard, or plastic.

When children in Germany and in parts of the Czech Republic close to the German border, in parts of Poland (Greater Poland, Upper Silesia, Warmia), in Austria, in the German-speaking parts of Switzerland  and Belgium set off for their first day of school upon entering first grade, their parents and/or grandparents present them with this large cone, attractively decorated and filled with toys, chocolate, candies/sweets, school supplies, and various other special treats. The cone is given to children to make this anxiously awaited first day of school a little sweeter.

History

The name translates as cone, even though the German word "Tüte" is translated into English in most other contexts as "bag"—see also ).

The tradition of the Schultüte has its origins in approximately the year 1810 in Saxony, Saxony-Anhalt, and Thuringia in Germany. The first documented report of cone-shaped Schultüten comes from the city of Jena in 1817, closely followed by reports from Dresden (1820) and Leipzig (1836). It started in the larger cities but spread quickly to small towns and villages, soon becoming an institution all over Germany.

In the early days of the concept of the Schultüte, before it spread to other parts of Germany, the usual routine was not to hand over the cone to the children personally.  Marked with the students' names, the cones were taken to the school by grandparents or godparents and in a ritual reminiscent of the Mexican piñata, they were hung on a metal Schultüten-Baum (school-cone tree) from which each child had to pick his or her cone, without breaking it. The story told to the children claimed that there was a Schultüten-Baum growing at the school, and if that tree's fruits (i.e. the Schultüten) were ripe and large enough to pick, it was then time to go to school for the first time.

The only custom that changed in the latter half of the 20th century is that fewer sweets seem to appear in the Schultüte, with more practical gifts such as crayons and pencils, small toys, CDs, books and even articles of clothing replacing the traditional chocolates and candies/sweets. These are traditionally given by grandparents who also take the child out to dinner the evening before school begins.

If they are not made by the parents, the school cones can be bought from shops ready-made or they are made by the children themselves in the kindergarten.

Christiane Cantauw, a German folklore expert at the Volkskundliche Kommission für Westfalen (Folkloristic Commission of Westphalia, based in the city of Münster), has researched the Schultüte tradition. In a 2016 interview with the broadcaster Deutsche Welle she explained how important the symbolism of the Schultüte tradition is for school beginners and their families, regardless of their financial means:

Shapes
After the division of Germany, hexagonal school cones with a length of 85 cm were established in East Germany, while the traditional round cones (usually 70 cm long) were preferred in the West.

Commercial production
The largest manufacturer of school cones in Germany is Nestler Feinkartonagen GmbH in Ehrenfriedersdorf. It produces more than two million school cones per year.

References

External links 

 Description of school supplies for the first day of school in Germany at The New York Times
 Why Germans celebrate school with a cardboard cone in the BBC news site.

Bags
German traditions